Michael Stockton "Mike" Keating  (born 25 January 1940) is a retired Australian senior public servant.

Early life
Michael Keating was born in 1940. Keating graduated from the University of Melbourne with a first class honours degree in economics. He then studied at the Australian National University, attaining his PhD in 1967.

Career
Keating was appointed Secretary of the Department of Employment and Industrial Relations in May 1983. In 1986 Keating shifted to head the Department of Finance.

In 1991, Prime Minister Paul Keating (no relation) recommended that Michael Keating be appointed as Secretary to the Department of the Prime Minister and Cabinet. Keating retired from the role and left the Australian Public Service in 1996.

Between 1997 and 2007, Keating was a visiting fellow in the Economics Program at the Australian National University. His two principal fields of interest were: integration of social and economic policy, particularly as it relates to improving labour market outcomes; and research into the factors which are affecting Australia's governance, and how governments, institutions and policies are responding, and how relations between the citizen and the state are changing.

In 2015 Keating was appointed as Chairman of The Committee for Sustainable Retirement Incomes.

Awards and honours
In January 1990, Keating was made an Officer of the Order of Australia in recognition of his public service. Six years later he was made a Companion of the Order of Australia, for service to social, economic and public sector reform, particularly as a leader in organizational and management reform.

In 2001, Keating was honoured with an honorary degree from Griffith University.

Works
With Stephen Bell:  

With Geoff Dixon:

References

Companions of the Order of Australia
Australian National University alumni
University of Melbourne alumni
1940 births
Living people
Secretaries of the Australian Department of Finance
Recipients of the Centenary Medal